The Cortez barnacle blenny (Acanthemblemaria hastingsi) is a species of chaenopsid blenny found in the Gulf of California, in the eastern Pacific Ocean. The specific name honours the marine biologist Philip A. Hastings of the Scripps Institution of Oceanography.

References

hastingsi
Fish of the Gulf of California
Fish of Mexican Pacific coast
Cortez barnacle blenny